Gracilancilla lindae is a species of sea snail, a marine gastropod mollusk in the family Ancillariidae.

Description
Original description: "Shell very thin and fragile, very elongated with extremely protracted spire; shell without shoulder, fusiform; aperture elongated, narrow; anterior one-fourth of shell with separate enameled area; protoconch extremely large in proportion to shell size, rounded, dome-like; color pale cream-white, highly polished; columella with 2 plications; interior of aperture pale cream-white."

Distribution
Locus typicus: "Off Punto Fijo, Paraguana Peninsula, 
Gulf of Venezuela, Venezuela."

References

Ancillariidae
Gastropods described in 1987